Anson W. Mackay is a Professor of Geography in the Environmental Change Research Centre at University College London. He works on the impact of climate change on freshwater ecosystems. Mackay is editor-in-chief of the Royal Geographical Society journal Geo: Geography and Environment and sits on the board of Open Quaternary.

Early life and education 
Mackay is from the Scottish highlands. He studied Biological Science at the University of Edinburgh and graduated in 1989. He moved to Manchester for his doctorate, and earned a PhD in palaeoecology in 1993. He was appointed a Leverhulme fellow at University College London.

Research and career 
Mackay was appointed a lecturer at University College London in 2000 and promoted to Professor in 2013. He has extensively investigated the impact of pollution on Lake Baikal, as well as the Aral Sea and Okavango Delta.

He has reconstructed the climate history of Lake Baikal for the past 800,000 years. Lake Baikal is the world's deepest and oldest lake, and is home to one fifth of the world's fresh water. Over 75% of the species exist nowhere else in the world. Mackay has studied the numbers of the microalgae diatoms in Lake Baikal, and showed that they have declined as the lake gets warmer. Some diatoms are more sensitive than others, which lets Mackay and colleagues look at the impact of pollution in the past. He studies the populations of diatoms by studying silicon isotopes, which form the base of the diatom food chain. Mackay believes that the water quality has deteriorated due to inadequate sewage treatment. Additionally, the nearby Baikal Paper and Pulp Mill generates sulphates, organic chlorine and hundreds of thousands of tonnes of bleached pulp, which make their way into the lake.  Mackay has shown that these changes have also impacted phytoplankton and zooplankton.

Academic service 
Mackay is editor-in-chief of the Royal Geographical Society journal Geo: Geography and Environment and sits on the board of Open Quaternary. He has written for The Conversation. He is routinely nominated for Student Choice awards, including Inspiring Teaching, Equality & Diversity and Exceptional Feedback. In 2017 Mackay established the LGBTQ+ network Out Geography. He is part of the network 500 Queer Scientists, and has been part of a successful parliamentary inquiry into the impact of scientific funding on equality and diversity.

Books

References 

Scottish scientists
Scottish geographers
British LGBT scientists
Academics of University College London
Alumni of the University of Manchester
Year of birth missing (living people)
Living people
21st-century LGBT people